Kena Marcela Romero Soto (born 31 October 1987) is a Colombian footballer who plays as a forward for Atlético Huila. She was a member of the Colombia women's national team.

International career
Romero played for Colombia at senior level in the 2011 Pan American Games.

References

1987 births
Living people
Women's association football forwards
Colombian women's footballers
Colombia women's international footballers
Pan American Games competitors for Colombia
Footballers at the 2011 Pan American Games
Atlético Huila (women) players
21st-century Colombian women